In Islamic tradition, Al Raqēm was the dog that guarded the legendary Seven Sleepers and that stood by them all through their long sleep. Other narrations identify that the dog was named Qitmēr. However, Al Raqēm has alternately been identified as the name of the location of the cave of the Seven Sleepers, or the name of a "brass plate, or stone table" located at the cave, naming the sleepers.

References

Rakim
Rakim
Animals in Islam